Ormiscodes is a genus of moths in the family Saturniidae first described by Blanchard in 1852.

Species
Ormiscodes amphinome (Fabricius, 1775)
Ormiscodes bruchi (Koehler, 1930)
Ormiscodes cinnamomea (Feisthamel, 1839)
Ormiscodes cognata Philippi, 1859
Ormiscodes eugeniae Brechlin & Meister, 2010
Ormiscodes joiceyi (Draudt, 1930)
Ormiscodes lauta (Berg, 1881)
Ormiscodes nigrolutea (Bouvier, 1924)
Ormiscodes nigrosignata (Philippi, 1859)
Ormiscodes penai Lemaire & Parra, 1995
Ormiscodes rufosignata (Blanchard, 1852)
Ormiscodes schmidtnielseni Lemaire, 1985
Ormiscodes shapiroi Lemaire, 1978
Ormiscodes socialis (Feisthamel, 1839)

References

Hemileucinae